Lethargy is a state of tiredness, sleepiness, weariness, fatigue, sluggishness or lack of energy. It can be accompanied by depression, decreased motivation, or apathy. Lethargy can be a normal response to inadequate sleep, overexertion, overworking, stress, lack of exercise, improper nutrition, boredom, or a symptom of an underlying illness or a disorder. It may also be a side-effect of medication or caused by an interaction between medications or medication(s) and alcohol. It may also be an altered level of consciousness. 

When part of a normal response, lethargy often resolves with rest, adequate sleep, decreased stress, physical exercise, and good nutrition. Lethargy's symptoms however can last days or even months, so it can be a sign of a recent underlying illness or infection if it doesn't resolve normally.

See also 
 Clinical depression
 Encephalitis lethargica
 Sleep apnea
 Sleep deprivation
 Somnolence

References

External links 
 

Symptoms